Glaucicodia is a monotypic moth genus of the family Noctuidae. Its only species, Glaucicodia leuconephra, is found on Cuba. Both the genus and species were first described by George Hampson in 1910.

References

Acontiinae
Monotypic moth genera
Endemic fauna of Cuba